{{safesubst:#invoke:RfD||2=More "upcoming" no longer upcoming|month = March
|day =  5
|year = 2023
|time = 21:41
|timestamp = 20230305214159

|content=
REDIRECT Silk Road (film)

}}